Maruthu Pandi is a 1990 Indian Tamil language action drama film directed by Manoj Kumar. The film stars Ramki, Seetha and Nirosha, with Nassar, S. S. Chandran, Senthil, Kovai Sarala, Raghavi and Pradeep Shakthi playing supporting roles. It was released on 27 April 1990 and became a major box office success. The film was remade in Kannada as Kollur Kala (1991) and in Hindi as Aag (1994).

Plot 

In the village Ammapatti, Maruthu Pandi is a coracle operator in the day and the village protector at night. The villagers give him food in exchange for his work. Maruthu Pandi has a mentally ill sister Lakshmi who is pregnant and he takes care of Lakshmi like a mother. Kanagavalli is a dancer performing in a dance troupe. After performing their dance in Ammapatti, the dancers leave Kanagavalli alone. The villagers help Kanagavalli to stay in the village : they build a house for her. Kanagavalli slowly falls in love with Maruthu Pandi. Kanagavalli is, in fact, a police officer who wants to arrest Maruthu Pandi. Maruthu Pandi's real name is Manickam.

In the past, Manickam was a poor tailor, where he lived happily with his only sister. Manickam was in love with Kavitha, daughter of a rich zamindar. Her father Jagannathan refuses to let his daughter marry Manickam; instead he wants to get her married to a zamindar like him : Inspector of Police Thiagarajan. On the day of the wedding, Kavitha drinks poison and dies. That same night, Jagannathan, Thiagarajan and Thiagarajan's friend Pradeep beat up Manickam and abduct Lakshmi and she is brutally raped by Thiagarajan. Manickam manages to beat up them while Jagannathan,Kavitha's father is killed in the process and Lakshmi becomes mentally unstable. He flees the village with his sister from that village.

Thiagarajan and his police team come to Ammapatti to arrest Manickam. What transpires later forms the crux of the story.

Cast 

Ramki as Maruthu Pandi / Manickam
Seetha as Kanagavalli
Nirosha as Kavitha
Nassar as Thiagarajan
S. S. Chandran as Nattamai
Senthil
Kovai Sarala
Raghavi as Lakshmi
Pradeep Shakthi as Pradeep
Singamuthu
Theni Kunjarammal
Srilekha
K. Kannan as Vellaisamy
Mohan Babu
Veera Raghavan
K. K. Soundar
Senji Krishnan
MLA Malliah
Joker Thulasi
Pasi Narayanan
Balambika

Soundtrack 
The film score and the soundtrack were composed by Ilaiyaraaja. The soundtrack, released in 1990, features 5 tracks with lyrics written by Vaali, Pulamaipithan, Na. Kamarasan, Gangai Amaran and Piraisoodan.

Reception 
P. S. S. of Kalki wrote that the director managed to narrate a gripping screenplay out of an age old plot.

References

External links 
 

1990 films
1990s action drama films
1990s Tamil-language films
Films scored by Ilaiyaraaja
Indian action drama films
Indian films about revenge
Tamil films remade in other languages